Vents Feldmanis (born March 7, 1977 in Jūrmala) is a Latvian ice hockey defenceman, currently playing for HK Metalurgs Liepāja of the Belarusian Extraleague. He has become one of the core players of the team, playing in it already since 1999.

He played for the Latvian national team at the 2003 World Championships.

Career statistics

External links
 
Eliteprospects profile

1977 births
Living people
People from Jūrmala
Latvian ice hockey defencemen
HK Liepājas Metalurgs players
HK Neman Grodno players
Metallurg Novokuznetsk players